The Snake River is a  small river in Bristol County, Massachusetts. It flows  from 
Winnecunnet Pond to Lake Sabbatia in the northern part of Taunton, Massachusetts.

It is part of the Mill River-Taunton River-Narragansett Bay watersheds. The Snake River is part of the Canoe River Aquifer Area of Critical Environmental Concern (Massachusetts) (ACEC).

References 

Rivers of Bristol County, Massachusetts
Taunton River watershed
Taunton, Massachusetts
Rivers of Massachusetts